OLB may stand for:

Oh Lord Buddha - Quotes related to Buddhism
Olbia - Costa Smeralda Airport, IATA airport code
Outside linebacker, a defensive position in American and Canadian football
Object Language Bindings (SQL/OLB) - a standard for embedding SQL in Java
Oldenburgische Landesbank - a German bank
Online Bible
Overpass Light Brigade - Series of illuminated (LED) signs used by activists and others. Each letter is held by a different person.
Operation London Bridge